Learn to Talk is a studio album by American experimental rock band Skeleton Crew, recorded at Sunrise Studio, Kirchberg, Switzerland, between Christmas and New Year 1983/1984. It was their debut album and was released in 1984.

The album was recorded when Skeleton Crew was the duo of Fred Frith and Tom Cora. The band was best known for their improvised live performances, during which they played various instruments simultaneously. While the recordings are not live (except for two tracks), they do to a large extent convey the dynamics of the live act. The music is both sparse and raw, consisting of songs interspaced with cello, guitar and violin instrumental fragments. Tape cut-ups also feature throughout the album, including a Ronald Reagan speech, Sousa's "Washington Post" and TV ad clips.

The songs were composed or arranged by Frith and Cora, except for "The Way Things Fall (Back Apart)" which included lyrics by Rebby Sharp, who Frith had worked with in Orthotonics.

Track listing

Track notes
"Victoryville" was recorded live in December 1983 at the 1st Festival International de Musique Actuelle de Victoriaville in Victoriaville, Quebec, Canada (additional material from a malfunctioning tape-recorder which played both sides of the tape at once).
Part of "Learn to Talk" recorded by CKRL in Quebec City.

Personnel
Tom Cora – cello, bass guitar, casio, drums, home-made drums and contraptions, singing
Fred Frith – guitar, six-string bass, violin, casio, home-made bass, piano, drums, singing

Guests
Röbl, Lu and Katrin – voices on "Los Colitos"

Sound and art work
Robert Vogel – engineer, producer
Fred Frith – engineer
Skeleton Crew – producer
Thomas Newbolt – cover art work

CD reissues
In 1990 RecRec Music re-issued Learn to Talk together with Skeleton Crew's next album The Country of Blinds on a single compilation CD, Learn to Talk / Country of Blinds, omitting "Los Colitos" and "Life At The Top" from Learn to Talk, and "Money Crack" from The Country of Blinds.

In 2005 Fred Records re-issued Learn to Talk / Country of Blinds on a double compilation CD, omitting only "Money Crack" from The Country of Blinds, and adding ten extra tracks.

References

1984 debut albums
Experimental music albums by American artists
RecRec Music albums